Parson Zazaharivelo Rakotovazaha is a Malagasy politician. A member of the National Assembly of Madagascar, he was elected from the Mayors' Association party; he represents the constituency of Mampikony.

References
Profile on National Assembly site

Year of birth missing (living people)
Living people
Members of the National Assembly (Madagascar)
Mayors' Association politicians
Place of birth missing (living people)
People from Sofia Region